Sravanamasam is a 2005 Indian Telugu-language family drama film written, directed and produced by Posani Krishna Murali. It stars Krishna, Harikrishna, Karthikeya, Gajala and Kalyani. The film released to negative reviews despite high expectations.

Cast 

Krishna as Krishna Rao
Harikrishna as Trimurtulu 
Karthikeya as Sambasiva Rao  
Gajala as Mahalakshmi 
Kalyani as Kavita Reddy 
Vijaya Nirmala
Bhanupriya as Rajyam
Nagababu as Saidulu
Suman
Jyothi
Keerthi Chawla
Suhasini
Jhansi as dhobi
Posani Krishna Murali
Kota Srinivasa Rao
Tanikella Bharani as purohit
A.V.S.
Chalapathi Rao
Babu Mohan
Brahmanandam
Ali 
Mallikarjuna Rao
M. S. Narayana 
L.B. Sriram
Venu Madhav
Sunil
Dharmavarapu Subramanyam
Kondavalasa
 Ganesh
 Gokina Rama Rao
 Giri Babu
 Mada
 Krishna Bhagawan 
 Telangana Shakuntala 
 Jayalalita
 Siva Parvathy
 Sana
 Hema

Production
Writer Posani Krishna Murali made his directorial debut with this film. Newcomer Karthik made his debut with this film. The film has a huge cast of sixty artists appearing in small roles.

Soundtrack 
Music by Vandemataram Srinivas. The audio rights were bagged by Aditya Music. The songs were well received upon release.

Release and reception 
The film released on 26 February 2005.

Jeevi of Idlebrain.com opined that "In a nut shell, Sravanamasam is an utterly disappointing film". Preetam Akkineni of Full Hyderabad mocked the film and said that "If the number of heroines isn't inspiration enough to watch the movie, maybe the gold being given away to lucky viewers is. To find out more about that, watch the film". A critic from Indiaglitz wrote that "There is no point in talking about the actors' and actresses' work when the story and its treatment are so amateurish. The intermixing of politics into the story is like adding bits of onion in halwa".

Despite the failure of this film, Posani Krishna Murali went on to direct many films including Operation Duryodhana (2007). Karthikeya Goud, one of the leads in this film, went on to play cameos in Ullasamga Utsahamga and Do Lafzon Ki Kahani.

References